John "Jack" William Shera was a Canadian politician who served as a Member of the North-West Legislative Assembly from 1898 until 1905, representing the district of Victoria in what is now eastern Alberta.

Early life
Shera was born in Ireland in the 1860s. He emigrated to Canada in 1872, first settling in Toronto. He moved to Regina (then part of the Northwest Territories) in 1882, and later to Fort Saskatchewan.

Political career
He first ran for office as an independent in the Northwest Territories general election of 1898, unseating incumbent Victoria MLA Frank Fraser Tims. He was re-elected in 1902 with a larger share of the vote.

When Alberta became a province in 1905, Shera sought re-election in the smaller Victoria district, this time running as a Conservative. He was defeated by the Liberal candidate, Francis A. Walker, and retired from politics.

Electoral record

|}

|}

|}

References

Members of the Legislative Assembly of the Northwest Territories
1860s births
1955 deaths